The men's lightweight (60 kg/132 lbs) Full-Contact category at the W.A.K.O. European Championships 2004 in Budva was the fourth lightest of the male Full-Contact tournaments and involved seven contestants.  Each of the matches was three rounds of two minutes each and were fought under Full-Contact kickboxing rules.

As there was not being enough participants for a tournament of eight, one of the fighters received a bye through to the semi finals.  The lightweight gold medallist was Daniel Martins from France who defeated Germany's Mike List.  Defeated semi finalists Galic Predrag from hosts Serbia and Montenegro and Damian Ławniczak from Poland won bronze.

Results

Key

See also
List of WAKO Amateur European Championships
List of WAKO Amateur World Championships
List of male kickboxers

References

External links
 WAKO World Association of Kickboxing Organizations Official Site

W.A.K.O. European Championships 2004 (Budva)